Olga Fedorovna Beggrow-Hartmann (1862–1922) was a German-Russian painter.

Biography
Beggrow-Hartmann was born on 29 October 1862 in Heidelberg, Germany. She studied art at the Staatliche Kunstakademie in Stuttgart where she was taught by Ferdinand Keller. She was married to the painter . Beggrow-Hartmann lived for a time in Saint Petersburg, Russia.
 
She exhibited her work at the Woman's Building and at the Russian Exhibition at the 1893 World's Columbian Exposition in Chicago, Illinois.

Beggrow-Hartmann died on 12 January 1922 in Munich, Germany.

Gallery

References

External links
  
images of Beggrow-Hartmann's paintings on ArtNet

  
1862 births 
1922 deaths
German women painters
19th-century German women artists
20th-century German women artists
19th-century German painters
20th-century German painters
Artists from Heidelberg